Villenave-d'Ornon is a railway station in Villenave-d'Ornon near Bordeaux, Nouvelle-Aquitaine, France. The station is located on the Bordeaux–Sète railway line. The station is served by TER (local) services operated by SNCF.

Train services
The following services currently call at Villenave-d'Ornon:
local service (TER Nouvelle-Aquitaine) Bordeaux - Langon

References

Railway stations in France opened in 1855
Railway stations in Gironde